Jacqueline Ann "Jackie" Searle (born 26 September 1960) is a British Anglican bishop. Since 2018, she has served as the Bishop of Crediton, a suffragan bishop of the Diocese of Exeter. She had previously been the Archdeacon of Gloucester between 2012 and 2018.

Early life and education
Searle was born on 26 September 1960 in Redhill, Surrey, England. She was educated at Talbot Heath School, an all-girls private school in Bournemouth. She studied at Whitelands College, Roehampton, graduating with a Bachelor of Education (BEd) degree in 1982. She worked as a teacher from 1982 until 1989. She trained for ordained ministry at Trinity College, Bristol, an evangelical Anglican theological college between 1990 and 1992.

Ordained ministry
She was ordained deacon in 1992, and priest in 1994. Her first ecclesiastical post was as parish deacon in the benefice of Christ Church and St Peter, Roxeth from 1992 to 1994, and as an assistant curate at St Stephen's Church, Ealing from 1994 to 1996, both in the Diocese of London. From 1996 to 2003, she was a tutor in applied theology and dean of women at Trinity College, Bristol, her alma mater. She was then Vicar of St Peter, Littleover from 2003 to 2012 in the Diocese of Derby. From 2012, she served as Archdeacon of Gloucester in the Diocese of Gloucester and as a residentiary canon of Gloucester Cathedral.

Episcopal ministry
In July 2018, it was announced that she would be the next Bishop of Crediton, a suffragan bishop in the Diocese of Exeter. On 27 September 2018, she was consecrated a bishop by John Sentamu, the Archbishop of York, during a service at Southwark Cathedral. She was welcomed into the diocese on 14 October.

Personal life
In 1992, Searle married David Runcorn. Together they have two children. David is also ordained in the Church of England.

References

1960 births
People from Redhill, Surrey
People educated at Talbot Heath School
Alumni of the University of Roehampton
Alumni of Trinity College, Bristol
Archdeacons of Gloucester
Women Anglican bishops
Living people
People from Littleover
Bishops of Crediton